Anton Poleschuk (born February 21, 1987) is a Russian professional ice hockey defenceman. He is currently a free agent having last played for High1 in Asia League Ice Hockey.

Poleschuk made his Kontinental Hockey League debut playing with Khimik Voskresensk during the 2008-09 season.

References

External links

1987 births
Living people
Admiral Vladivostok players
Amur Khabarovsk players
Avangard Omsk players
High1 players
Kazzinc-Torpedo players
Khimik Voskresensk (KHL) players
Metallurg Magnitogorsk players
Molot-Prikamye Perm players
HC MVD players
Neftyanik Almetyevsk players
People from Surgut
Rubin Tyumen players
Russian ice hockey defencemen
Sputnik Nizhny Tagil players
Toros Neftekamsk players
Yertis Pavlodar players
Yuzhny Ural Orsk players